Tara Rocks GAA is a Gaelic Athletic Association club located outside Gorey, County Wexford, Ireland. The club is primarily concerned with the games of hurling and camogie.

History

According to its website, Tara Rocks is the "smallest club in Wexford, having just over one mile square of a catchment area" outside Gorey. The club dates to the first half of the 20th century. Their first major success occurred in 1948 when Tara Rocks won the Wexford JFC title. 

Tara Rocks secured a Leinster Club JBHC title in 2006, before losing the All-Ireland final to Menlo Emmets. A shortage of players in 2017 resulted in Tara Rocks amalgamating for a period with Kilanerin-Ballyfad, having previously joined with them at underage level. The amalgamation years resulted in a resurgence of the club, with Tara Rocks winning the Wexford IAHC title in 2021.

Honours

Wexford Intermediate A Hurling Championship (1): 2021
Wexford Junior Football Championship (1): 1948
Leinster Junior B Club Hurling Championship (1): 2006
Wexford Junior B Hurling Championship (2): 1997, 2006
Wexford Junior B Football Championship (1): 1984
Gorey District Junior B Hurling Championship (5): 1995, 1996, 1997, 2005, 2006
Gorey District Junior B Football Championship (8): 1987, 1997, 2000, 2001, 2002, 2004, 2005, 2006

Notable players

 Niall Breen

References

External link

 Tara Rocks GAA website

Gaelic games clubs in County Wexford
Hurling clubs in County Wexford